Madonna Acres Historic District is a historic post-World War II neighborhood and national historic district located  miles east of downtown Raleigh, North Carolina. The district encompasses 36 contributing buildings in Raleigh's first subdivision developed by an African American for African Americans. It includes a collection of Split-level and Ranch-style houses constructed of brick with accent walls of stone veneer or wood.  A number of the houses feature carports.

It was listed on the National Register of Historic Places in 2010.

References

External links 
 National Register Historic Districts in Raleigh, North Carolina, RHDC
 Madonna Acres Historic District, RHDC

African-American history in Raleigh, North Carolina
Houses on the National Register of Historic Places in North Carolina
Historic districts on the National Register of Historic Places in North Carolina
Modernist architecture in North Carolina
Neighborhoods in Raleigh, North Carolina
National Register of Historic Places in Raleigh, North Carolina
Houses in Raleigh, North Carolina